FC Namdong was a South Korean football club based in the district of Namdong-gu in the city of Incheon. The team was founded in 2019 and last played in the K4 League, a semi-professional league and the fourth tier of football in South Korea. In 2022, the club dissolved,.

History
On August 1, 2022, the club was dissolved.

However, they were not able to withstand the public opinion and headed towards disbanding the club as a result.

After inquiring about the disbandment with the Football Association and FC Namdong on August 16, the Football Association was expected to make a final decision. On August 19, 2022, the Football Association disqualified Namdong from its league membership, effectively confirming the dissolution of Namdong. At the same time, the club registration was canceled, allowing the transfer of 30 players at the time of disbandment.

Season-by-season records

See also
 List of football clubs in South Korea

References

External links
Official website  

FC Namdong
Sport in Incheon
Association football clubs established in 2019
2019 establishments in South Korea
Association football clubs disestablished in 2022
K4 League clubs
2022 disestablishments in South Korea